Carter G. Woodson Home National Historic Site at 1538 9th Street NW, in the Shaw neighborhood of Washington, D.C., preserves the home of Carter G. Woodson (1875–1950). Woodson, the founder of Black History Month, was an African-American historian, author, and journalist.

History
The property served as Dr. Woodson's home from 1922 until his death in 1950. From this three-story Victorian rowhouse, Woodson managed the operations of the Association for the Study of African American Life and History, published the Negro History Bulletin and the Journal of Negro History, operated Associated Publishers, and pursued his own research
and writing about African-American history. The home continued to serve as the national headquarters of the Association until the early 1970s.

The house was designated a National Historic Landmark in 1976 but became vacant in the 1990s. In 2001, the National Trust for Historic Preservation placed the site on its annual "America's 11 Most Endangered Historic
Places" list. With advocacy by the NTHP, the DC Preservation League, community activists, and Congresswoman Eleanor Holmes Norton, the National Historic Site was authorized by Public Law 108-192 on December 19, 2003, and established by Secretary of the Interior Gale Norton on February 27, 2006.

In 2005, the property was acquired by the National Park Service which opened it to the public in 2017. It is operated in conjunction with the Mary McLeod Bethune Council House National Historic Site.

References

External links
 
 Carter G. Woodson Home National Historic Site
 Public Law 108-192 authorizing Carter G. Woodson Home National Historic Site
 Federal Register: February 27, 2006 (Volume 71, Number 38), p. 9834 establishing National Historic Site
 Announcement of site establishment
 National Historic Landmark information

National Historic Sites in Washington, D.C.
National Historic Landmarks in Washington, D.C.
Houses on the National Register of Historic Places in Washington, D.C.
Protected areas established in 2006
National Capital Parks-East
Victorian architecture in Washington, D.C.
African-American history of Washington, D.C.
2006 establishments in Washington, D.C.